Philodendron devansayeanum is a species of flowering plant in the family Araceae. It is endemic to Peru.

References 

devansayeanum